Armando González (born August 5, 1970) is an American businessperson, kickboxer and promoter. He is currently the CEO of RIZE Fighting Championship. He is known for organizing professional MMA events in Florida.

Career 
In 2018, Gonzalez earned a regional S. E. USA Championship Title. He hosted professional MMA events in Florida.

Gonzalez founded RIZE Fighting Championship in collaboration with Global Fighting Solutions in 2018.

In March 2021, a wild brawl erupted at an MMA event of RIZE fighting Championship, Gonzalez as an organizer of the event told WPBF about the brawl that took place that day. Nypost also reported the event.

Awards

References 

Kickboxers from Florida
Living people
Businesspeople from Florida
1970 births